Ping Pong is the eleventh studio album by Scottish musician Momus, released in 1997. It has been described as the beginning of his "analog baroque" style.

The album's tenth track, "Lolitapop Dollhouse", was recorded by Japanese musician Kahimi Karie and released on her 1997 album Larme de Crocodile, which featured four other Momus-penned tracks.

Track listing

References

1997 albums
Momus (musician) albums